Blue Collar Solitude is the first studio album by American band Kilgore (Smudge), released on November 7, 1995, through label Warner Bros. Records.

Track listing

Personnel
Jay Berndt – lead vocals
Bill Southerland – drums
Jason "Smitty" Smith – bass guitar
Michael Pelletier – lead guitar
Brian McKenzie – lead guitar, backing vocals

References

1995 albums